Paracleros is a genus of skippers in the family Hesperiidae.

Species
Paracleros biguttulus (Mabille, 1889)
Paracleros maesseni Berger, 1978
Paracleros placidus (Plötz, 1879)
Paracleros sangoanus (Carcasson, 1964)
Paracleros staudei Collins & Larsen, 2000
Paracleros substrigata (Holland, 1893)

References

External links
Natural History Museum Lepidoptera genus database
Seitz, A. Die Gross-Schmetterlinge der Erde 13: Die Afrikanischen Tagfalter. Plate XIII 77

Erionotini
Hesperiidae genera